Morabito is a surname. Notable people with the surname include:

Anthony Morabito (born 1991), Australian rules footballer
Fabio Morábito (born 1955), Mexican writer and poet
Giuseppe Morabito (born 1934), nicknamed 'u tiradrittu' ("shootstraight"), Italian criminal and a historical boss of the 'Ndrangheta
Linda A. Morabito (born 1953), American astronomer
Marco Morabito, Italian film producer and editor
Rocco Morabito (photographer), American photographer
Rocco Morabito (mobster, born 1960), Italian criminal and a member of the 'Ndrangheta
Rocco Morabito (mobster, born 1966), Italian criminal and a member of the 'Ndrangheta
Rossana Morabito (born 1969), Italian retired runner
Steve Morabito (born 1983), Swiss professional road bicycle racer
Tony Morabito (1910–1957), founder of the San Francisco 49ers

Other uses
Morabito (brand), French luxury brand
Al-Morabito Mosque (Spanish: Mezquita El Morabito), Islamic place of worship in Córdoba, Spain

Italian-language surnames